Dinesh Kumar Singh (born 1977) is a male international Indian lawn bowler.

Bowls career

Commonwealth Games
Kumar has represented India at three Commonwealth Games in the triples at the 2010 Commonwealth Games, the pairs and fours at the 2014 Commonwealth Games and in the triples and fours at the 2018 Commonwealth Games. In the 2014 men's fours the team topped their section but lost the bronze medal play off to Australia. Four years later the men's fours team won section B but failed to win a medal after losing to Wales in the quarter finals. In 2022, he competed in the men's pairs and the men's fours at the 2022 Commonwealth Games. In the fours event as part of the team with Navneet Singh, Chandan Kumar Singh and Sunil Bahadur he reached the final and secured a silver medal.

World Championships
In 2020 he was selected for the 2020 World Outdoor Bowls Championship in Australia.

Asia Pacific
Kumar won a triples bronze medal at the 2019 Asia Pacific Bowls Championships in the Gold Coast, Queensland.

References

Living people
Bowls players at the 2010 Commonwealth Games
Bowls players at the 2014 Commonwealth Games
Bowls players at the 2018 Commonwealth Games
Bowls players at the 2022 Commonwealth Games
Commonwealth Games silver medallists for India
Commonwealth Games medallists in lawn bowls
Indian sportspeople
1977 births
Indian bowls players
People from Ranchi
Medallists at the 2022 Commonwealth Games